Mortal Kombat may refer to:

MK franchise 
 Mortal Kombat, an American video game franchise series created by Ed Boon and John Tobias
 Mortal Kombat (1992 video game), the first game in the Mortal Kombat series of games
 Mortal Kombat (2011 video game), a reboot for the PlayStation 3 and Xbox 360
 Mortal Kombat (1995 film), a film adaptation based on the first video game
 Mortal Kombat (2021 film), a film adaptation based on the video game franchise
 Mortal Kombat: The Album, a 1994 album accompaniment to the video game series

Other uses

Mortal Combat
Mortal Combat may refer to:

 Mortal Combat, alternate title of the 1978 film Crippled Avengers
 "Mortal Combat of Light and Shadow", an episode of Beast King GoLion (1981–1982)
 "Mortal Combat", an episode from season 2 of Eli Stone (2008–09)
 "Mortal Combat", a song from Big Daddy Kane's album It's a Big Daddy Thing

See also 

Immortal Kombat (disambiguation)
Immortal Combat (disambiguation)